There are more than 1200 islands in the Adriatic Sea, 69 of which are inhabited. A recent study by the Institute of Oceanography in Split (2000) shows that there are 1246 islands: 79 large islands, 525 islets, and 642 ridges and rocks. The Italian Scuola di Geografia of Genoa states that the number is greater if one includes the small islands in the Italian lagoons of Venice and Grado, and the so-called "islands of the Po delta".

Croatia

Adriatic islands in Croatia include:

Northern seacoast:

 the Brijuni islands
 Krk (one of two islands with the largest area: 405.78 km²)
 Cres (one of two islands with the largest area: 405.78 km²)
 Lošinj
 Ilovik
 Unije
 Susak
 Goli Otok
 Rab
 Pag (the island with the longest coastline: 302.47 km)
 Olib
 Silba
 Ist
 Molat

Northern Dalmatia:

 Vir
 Dugi Otok
 Ugljan
 Iž
 Pašman
 the Kornati archipelago
 Murter
 Prvić
 Zlarin
 Krapanj

Central and southern Dalmatia:

 Čiovo
 Drvenik
 Šolta
 Brač (the island with the highest elevation: 778m)
 Hvar (the longest island: 68 km)
 Pakleni islands
 Šćedro
 Vis
 Biševo
 Korčula
 Lastovo
 Mljet
 the Elaphiti islands - Koločep, Lopud, Šipan
 Lokrum
 Palagruža
Veli Brijun,
Sveti Klement,
Dolin,
Svetac (Sveti Andrija), 
Zverinac,
Sušac,
Škarda,
Rava,
Rivanj,
Drvenik Mali,
Kakan,
Zmajan,
Jakljan,
Prežba,
Tijat,
Piškera,
Zeča,
Vrgada,
Lavdara Vela,
Tun Veli,
Škrda,
Levrnaka,
Lavsa,
Sit,
Kurba Vela,
Mrčara,
Arta Velika,
Velike Srakane,
Katina,
Planik,
Mali Brijun,
Vele Orjule,
Smokvica Vela (Kornat),
Badija,
Sveti Petar,
Žižanj,
Olipa,
Škulj,
Gangaro,
Babac,
Koludarc,
Tramerka,
Kopište,
Sveti Marko,
Lokrum,
Marinkovac,
Šilo Veliko,
Proizd,
Češvinica,
Stipanska,
Murvenjak,
Lunga (Kornat),
Male Srakane,
Košara,
Obonjan,
Radelj,
Zečevo (Pag),
Kobrava,
Kručica,
Arkanđel,
Kurba Mala,
Saplun,
Glamoč,
Oruda,
Zvirinovik,
Krknata,
Orud,
Arta Mala,
Logorun,
Aba Duga,
Knežak,
Oključ,
Maslinovik,
Mišjak Veli,
Tetovišnjak Veliki,
Tetovišnjak Mali, Kasela,
Lupac,
Male Orjule,
Gangarol,
Ošljak,
Trstenik (Cres),
Mišjak Mali,
Šćitna,
Veliki Budikovac,
Kameni Žakan,
Drvenik (Zlarin),
Ravni Žakan,
Dobri Otok,
Ruda,
Stomorina,
Luški Otok,
Gustac,
Palagruža,
Vela,
Kozjak,
Jerolim,
Veli Pržnjak

Montenegro

 Sveti Nikola Island
 Sveta Neđelja
 Katič
 Ada Bojana/Ada e Bunës
 Stari Ulcinj/Ulqini i Vjetër
 Sveti Stefan (now a peninsula)

Gjerana Rock, Small Rock, Big Rock (Ulcinj Riviera)

In Bay of Kotor
 Mamula
 Prevlaka
 Sveti Marko
 Otok
 Gospa od Škrpjela
 Sveti Đorđe

Italy

The following islands of Italy are in the Adriatic Sea:

 Tremiti islands (off the peninsula of Gargano)
 San Domino
 San Nicola
 Capperaia
 Cretaccio
 Pianosa
 Po river delta
 Isola Albarella
 Isola Donzella
 Isola di Ariano
 Isola Tolle
 Isola Pila
 Isola Gnocca

Venetian Lagoon

The most important of the 130 islands in the Venetian Lagoon are:

Venice 
Sant'Erasmo 
Murano 
Chioggia 
Giudecca 
Mazzorbo 
Torcello 
Sant'Elena 
La Certosa 
Burano 
Tronchetto 
Sacca Fisola 
San Michele 
Sacca Sessola 
Santa Cristina 

Other inhabited islands in the Venetian Lagoon include:

Cavallino
Lazzaretto Nuovo
Lazzaretto Vecchio
Lido
Pellestrina
Poveglia
San Clemente
San Francesco del Deserto
San Giorgio in Alga
San Giorgio Maggiore
San Lazzaro degli Armeni
Santa Maria della Grazia
San Pietro di Castello
San Servolo
Santo Spirito
Sottomarina
Vignole

Grado-Marono Lagoon
 

The most important of the nearly 120 islands in the Grado-Marano Lagoon are:

 Anfora
 Barbana island
 Beli
 Fossalon
 Gorgo
 Grado
 Martignano
 Morgo
 Panera
 Porto Buso
 Ravaiarina
 San Pietro d'Orio
 Schiusa

Albania

 Franz Joseph Island
 Kunë
 Sazan
 Zvërnec Islands

References

Adriatic

Islands in the Adriatic